The following notable old boys of Eton College were born in the 19th century.

19th century
William George Hay, 18th Earl of Erroll, (1801–1846)
 Winthrop Mackworth Praed (1802–1839), poet and politician
 José Agustín de Lecubarri (1802-1874), diplomat and navy officer
 Sir John William Lubbock (1803–1865), Vice-Chancellor, University of London, 1837–1842, astronomer and mathematician
Field Marshal Lord William Paulet GCB (1804–1893), British Army officer
 James Howard Harris, 3rd Earl of Malmesbury (1807–1889), Secretary of State for Foreign Affairs, 1852, 1858–1859, and Lord Privy Seal, 1866–1868, 1874–1876
 Frederick Tennyson (1807–1898), poet
 William Cavendish, 7th Duke of Devonshire (1808–1891), politician and benefactor of science and industry
 William Ewart Gladstone (1809–1898), President of the Board of Trade, 1843–1845, Colonial Secretary, 1845–1846, Chancellor of the Exchequer, 1852–1855, 1859–1866, and Prime Minister, 1868–1874, 1880–1885, 1886, 1892–1894
 Alexander Kinglake (1809–1891), military historian
 George Augustus Selwyn (1809–1878), Bishop of New Zealand, 1841–1867, and Lichfield, 1868–1878

1810s
 George Harris, 3rd Baron Harris (1810–1872), Governor of Madras, 1854–1859
 James Milnes Gaskell (1810–1873), politician, Lord of the Treasury
 Charles Kean (1811–1868), actor
 John Bowes (1811–1885), art collector, founder of the Bowes Museum
 Arthur Henry Hallam (1811–1833), poet
 Rodolphus Johannes Leslie Hibernicus de Salis (general), (1811–), Colonel of the 8th Hussars
 William Andreas Salicus Fane De Salis (1812–), company chairman 
 Robert Moore (1812–1857), cricketer and clergyman
 John Story (1812–1872), cricketer
 John Dolignon (1813–1896), cricketer
 Robert Sutton (1813–1885), first-class cricketer and reverend
 Sir Arthur Borton (1814–1893), Governor of Malta, 1878–1884
 Sir John William Kaye KCSI (1814 – 1876), military historian, civil servant and army officer.
 Arthur Kinnaird, 10th Lord Kinnaird (1814–1887), banker, politician and philanthropist
 Sir John Lawes (1814–1899), agriculturist
 George Vance (1814–1839), cricketer
 Lieutenant-Colonel Douglas Labalmondière (1815–1893), Assistant Commissioner of Police of the Metropolis, 1856–1888
 John Charles Ryle (1816–1900), Anglican evangelical theologian and first Bishop of Liverpool
 Thomas Gambier Parry (1816–1888), English artist and art collector
 Edmund Beckett, 1st Baron Grimthorpe (1816–1905), Chancellor and Vicar-General of the Province of York, 1877–1900, and clock designer
 Leopold Fane De Salis, (1816-1898), Australian pastoralist and politician
 George Seymour (1816–1838), cricketer
 Henry Woodyer (1816–1896)
 Sir Algernon Coote, 11th Baronet (1817–1899), Irish cricketer and clergyman
 Frederick Garnett (1817–1874), cricketer
 George Lyttelton, 4th Baron Lyttelton of Frankley (1817–1876), politician and co-founder of Canterbury, New Zealand
 Lieutenant-General Lord Henry Percy (1817–1877), Crimean War Victoria Cross
 John Coleridge, 1st Baron Coleridge (1820–1894), Attorney General, 1871–1873, Chief Justice of the Common Pleas, 1873–1880, and Lord Chief Justice, 1880–1894
 Sir John Carmichael-Anstruther, 6th Baronet (1818–1831), shot at Eton
 John Wynne (1819–1893), cricketer and clergyman

1820s
 Tsatur Khan (1820-1905), General and Persian Envoy to Russia
 Sir Richard Garth (1820–1903), Chief Justice of Bengal, 1875–1886
 Edward Thring (1821–1887), Headmaster of Uppingham School, 1853–1887
 Maxwell Blacker (1822–1888), cricketer and clergyman
 John Francis Campbell of Islay (1822–1885), Gaelic scholar
 John Buller (1823–1867), cricketer and soldier
 William Johnson Cory (1823–1892), poet
 Horatio Nelson, 3rd Earl Nelson (1823-1913), Politician
 Henry Hildyard (1824–1898), cricketer and clergyman
James Leigh Joynes (1824–1908), clergyman and schoolmaster
 Robert Honywood (1825–1870), cricketer
 William Spottiswoode (1825–1883), President of the Royal Society, 1878–1883, mathematician and physicist
 Frederick Coleridge (1826–1906), cricketer and clergyman
 Thomas Levett, 1826, later Levett-Prinsep of Croxall Hall, Derbyshire
 General Sir George Higginson (1826–1927), Crimean War soldier, commander of the Brigade of Guards
 Lieutenant-Colonel Sir Charles Russell (1826–1883), Crimean War Victoria Cross and politician
 John Coleridge Patteson (1827–1871), Bishop of Melanesia, 1861–1871, and martyr
 Sir Charles Oakeley, 4th Baronet (1828–1915), cricketer and soldier
 Frederick Eden (1829–1916), cricketer
 Lieutenant-General Sir Charles Fraser (1829–1895), Indian Mutiny Victoria Cross
Henry Agar-Ellis, 3rd Viscount Clifden, won both Derby and St. Leger in 1848
 Sir James Fitzjames Stephen (1829–1894), judge

1830s
 Edwin Blake (1830–1914), civil engineer and politician in New Zealand
 William Brodrick, 8th Viscount Midleton (1830-1907), peer and politician
 Robert Cecil, 3rd Marquess of Salisbury (1830–1903), Secretary of State for India, 1866–1867, 1874–1878, Secretary of State for Foreign Affairs, 1878–1880, 1885–1886, 1887–1892, 1895–1900, and Prime Minister, 1885–1886, 1886–1892, 1895–1902
 James Payn (1830–1898), novelist, poet, editor and journalist
 Clement Walker Heneage (1831–1901), Indian Mutiny Victoria Cross
 Fiennes Cornwallis 1831–1867
 Henry Labouchère (1831–1912), politician and publisher
 Sir Robert Herbert (1831–1905), first Premier of Queensland
 Lieutenant-Colonel Richard Pearson (1831–1890), Assistant Commissioner of Police of the Metropolis, 1881–1890
 George Fosbery (1832–1907), Umbeyla Expedition Victoria Cross and firearms expert
 Gerald Goodlake (1832–1890), Crimean War Victoria Cross
 Robert Loyd-Lindsay, 1st Baron Wantage (1832–1901), Crimean War Victoria Cross and politician
 Harry Moody (1832–1921), cricketer and civil servant
 Field Marshal Frederick Sleigh Roberts, 1st Earl Roberts (1832–1914), Commander-in-Chief, Madras, 1881–1885, India, 1885–1893, Ireland, 1895–1899, and South Africa, 1899–1900, Commander-in-Chief, 1901–1904, and Indian Mutiny Victoria Cross
 Sir Leslie Stephen (1832–1904), Editor, Dictionary of National Biography, 1882–1891, and writer
 Charles Stuart Aubrey Abbott, 3rd Baron Tenterden (1834–1882), diplomat
 John Lubbock, 1st Baron Avebury (1834–1913), Vice-Chancellor, University of London, 1872–1880, Chairman, London County Council, 1890–1892, banker, scientist, archaeologist and author
 Edward Ede (1834–1908), cricketer, twin brother of the below
 George Ede (1834–1870), cricketer and jockey, winner of the 1868 Grand National, twin brother of the above
 William Molyneux, 4th Earl of Sefton (1835–1897), KG, Lord Lieutenant of Lancashire
 F. C. Burnand (1836–1917), librettist, translator and dramatist
 William Hartopp (1836–1874), cricketer and soldier
 Sir Frederick Albert Bosanquet (1837–1923), Common Serjeant of London 1900–1917
 Oscar Browning (1837–1923), historian
 Algernon Charles Swinburne (1837–1909), poet
 Edmond Warre (1837–1920), oarsman and Head Master (later Provost) of Eton
 General Sir Redvers Buller (1839–1908), Adjutant General, 1890–1897, General Officer Commanding Natal, 1899–1900, and I Corps, 1901–1906, and Zulu War Victoria Cross
 Col. Sir Francis Arthur Marindin (1838–1900), Senior Inspecting Officer of Railways, Board of Trade and President of the Football Association.
 Charles Wood, 2nd Viscount Halifax (1839-1919) president of the English Church Union from 1868 to 1919

1840s
 Tankerville Chamberlayne (1840–1924), Member of Parliament for Southampton
 Charles Garnett (1840–1919), cricketer
Sir William Mackworth Young KCSI, Lieutenant-Governor of the Punjab 
 Duncan Pocklington (1841–1870), cricketer and Oxford rower
 Osbert Mordaunt (1842–1923), cricketer
 William Rose (1842–1917), cricketer
 John William Strutt, 3rd Baron Rayleigh (1842–1919), Cavendish Professor of Experimental Physics, University of Cambridge, 1879–1884, Professor of natural philosophy, Royal Institution, 1887–1905, Secretary to the Royal Society, 1887–1896, and Nobel Laureate
 Admiral of the Fleet Sir Arthur Knyvet Wilson (1842–1921), Third Sea Lord, 1897–1901, Flag Officer Commanding Channel Squadron, 1901–1908, and Home Fleet, 1903–1907, First Sea Lord, 1909–1912, and Sudan Campaign Victoria Cross
 Edward Wynne-Finch (1842–1914), cricketer
 Sir Charles Lawes-Wittewronge (1843–1911), oarsman, cyclist, runner and sculptor
 John Boddam-Whetham (1843–1918), naturalist and cricketer
 James Saumarez, 4th Baron de Saumarez (1843–1937), diplomat
 Arthur Teape (1843–1885), cricketer
 Robert Bridges (1844–1930), Poet Laureate, 1913–1930
 Arthur John Butler (1844–1910), professor of Italian language and literature at University College, London
 Arthur Wood (1844–1933), cricketer
 Quintin Hogg (1845–1903), sugar merchant, philanthropist and Scotland footballer
 General Sir Neville Lyttelton (1845–1931), Commander-in-Chief, South Africa, 1902–1904, Chief of the General Staff, 1904–1908, General Officer Commanding-in-Chief Ireland, 1908–1912, and Governor, Royal Hospital Chelsea, 1912–1931
 John Campbell, 9th Duke of Argyll (1845-1914), Governor-General of Canada, 1878-1883
 Henry Petty-Fitzmaurice, 5th Marquess of Lansdowne (1845–1927), Governor-General of Canada, 1883–1888, Viceroy of India, 1888–1893, Secretary of State for War, 1895–1900, and Secretary of State for Foreign Affairs, 1900–1905
 Charles Nicholas Paul Phipps (1845–1913), Brazil merchant and Conservative member of parliament for Westbury (1880–1885)
 Sir Frederick Pollock (1845–1937), Corpus Professor of Jurisprudence, University of Oxford, 1883–1903
 Vincent Coles (1845-1929), Principal of Pusey House, Oxford 1897-1909.
 Sir Thomas Chapman, 7th Baronet (1846–1919), father of T. E. Lawrence
 Sir Charles Edmond Knox (1846–1938), Lieutenant-General
 Edmond Fitzmaurice, 1st Baron Fitzmaurice (1846–1935), Chancellor of the Duchy of Lancaster, 1908–1909, and writer
 Charles Alexander  (1847–1902), cricketer and barrister
 Lord William Beresford (1847–1900), Zulu War Victoria Cross
 Arthur Fitzgerald Kinnaird, 11th Lord Kinnaird (1847–1923), footballer, and President of the Football Association, 1890–1923
 Archibald Primrose, 5th Earl of Rosebery (1847–1929), Secretary of State for Foreign Affairs, 1892–1894, and Prime Minister, 1894–1895
 Martin Gosselin (1847-1905), Envoy Extraordinary and Minister Plenipotentiary to Portugal 1902-1905
 Arthur James Balfour, 1st Earl of Balfour (1848–1930), Prime Minister, 1902–1905, First Lord of the Admiralty, 1915–1916, and Secretary of State for Foreign Affairs, 1916–1919
 Digby Mackworth Dolben (1848–1867), poet
 Sir Henry Maxwell Lyte (1848–1940), Deputy Keeper of the Public Records, 1886–1926, and historian
 Sir Hubert Parry (1848–1918), Director, Royal College of Music, 1895–1918, Professor of Music, University of Oxford, 1899–1908, and composer
 Julian Sturgis (1848–1904), librettist who played football as an amateur for the Wanderers F.C. winning the FA Cup in 1873, and was thus the first American to win an FA Cup Final.
 Lord Randolph Churchill (1849–1894), Secretary of State for India, 1885–1886, and Chancellor of the Exchequer, 1886–1887
 Sir Joseph Dimsdale (1849–1912), Lord Mayor of London, 1901–1902, and politician
 Lieut-Col Richard W.B. Mirehouse (formerly Richard Walter Byrd Levett) (1849–1914), High Sheriff of Pembrokeshire, 1886, and Lieutenant Colonel of 4th Batt. North Staffs Regiment.

1850s
 Frederic William Maitland (1850–1906), Downing Professor of the Laws of England, University of Cambridge, 1888–1906
 William Legge, 6th Earl of Dartmouth (1851-1936) British peer, Conservative politician, Vice-Chamberlain of the Household 
 George Harris, 4th Baron Harris (1851–1932), Governor of Bombay, 1890–1895, and England cricketer
 Sir John Murray (1851–1928), publisher
 Henry Stephens Salt (1851–1939), writer, social reformer, socialist, animal rights campaigner, vegetarian, literary critic, and biographer
 Arthur Augustus Tilley (1851–1942), literary historian
 Reginald Brett, 2nd Viscount Esher (1852–1930), Secretary, Office of Works, 1895–1902, defence expert and writer
 William Ellison-Macartney (1852–1924), MP for South Antrim, 1885–1903, Governor of Tasmania, 1913–1917, Governor of Western Australia, 1917–1920
 Arthur Lyttelton (1852–1903), Master of Selwyn College, Cambridge, 1882–1893
 Henry Legge (1852-1924), British soldier and courtier
Gerald Balfour, 2nd Earl of Balfour (1853-1945) Conservative politician
 Major Ernest Gambier-Parry (1853–1936), Suakin Expedition 1885, author, musician, artist
 Mark Hanbury Beaufoy, (1854–1922) Liberal member of parliament, author of 'Never, never, let your gun pointed be at anyone...'
 Alfred Clayton Cole (1854–1920), Governor of the Bank of England
James Leigh Joynes (1854–1893), journalist, writer, poet and socialist activist
 Sir Horace Plunkett (1854–1932), Irish politician and writer
Howard Sturgis (1855-1920), Novelist
 William Edwards (1855–1912), Sudan Campaign Victoria Cross
 James Lowther, 1st Viscount Ullswater (1855–1949), Conservative politician
 Edward Lyttelton (1855–1942), Headmaster of Haileybury School, 1890–1905, and Eton, 1905–1916, and writer, who made one appearance for England in 1878.
 St John Brodrick, 1st Earl of Midleton (1856–1942), Secretary of State for War, 1900–1903, and Secretary of State for India, 1903–1905
Herbert Edward Ryle (1856–1925), Old Testament scholar and Dean of Westminster.
Algernon Haskett-Smith (1856–1887), cricketer 
Alfred Lyttelton (1857–1913), Colonial Secretary, 1903–1905, and England footballer.
 Field Marshal Herbert Plumer, 1st Viscount Plumer (1857–1932), quartermaster general, 1904–1905, General Officer Commanding Northern Command, 1911–1914, II Corps, 1914–1915, Second Army, 1915–1917, 1918, Italian Expeditionary Force, 1917–1918, and British Army of the Rhine, 1918–1919, Governor of Malta, 1919–1924, and High Commissioner for Palestine, 1925–1928
 Walter Forbes (1858–1933), cricketer
 Sir Charles Hawtrey (1858–1923), actor-manager
 Sir Henry Miers (1858–1942), Waynflete Professor of Mineralogy, University of Oxford, 1895–1908, principal, University of London, 1908–1915, and vice-chancellor, Victoria University of Manchester, 1915–1926
 Sir Kynaston Studd (1858–1944), Lord Mayor of London, 1928–1929, and philanthropist
 George Nathaniel Curzon, 1st Marquess Curzon of Kedleston (1859–1925), Viceroy of India, 1899–1905, and Secretary of State for Foreign Affairs, 1919–1924
Reginald Heber Macaulay (1858–1937), footballer who won the FA Cup with Old Etonians in 1882 and made one appearance for England in 1878.
Harry Chester Goodhart (1858–1895), twice FA Cup winner and England international footballer, who went on to become Professor of Humanities at Edinburgh University.
 Arthur Chitty (1859–1908), cricketer and barrister
 Sir Lionel Cust (1859–1929), Director, National Portrait Gallery, 1895–1909, and Surveyor of the King's Pictures, 1901–1927
 Sidney Gambier-Parry (1859–1948), ecclesiastical architect
 Sir Cecil Spring Rice (1859–1918), Minister to Persia, 1906–1908, and Sweden, 1908–1912, and ambassador to the United States, 1912–1918
James Kenneth Stephen (1859–1892), poet, tutor to Prince Albert Victor Edward (Prince Eddy), Virginia Woolf's cousin, Barrister, suffered from bi-polar disorder, one of suspects as Jack the Ripper

1860s
 Martin Hawke, 7th Baron Hawke of Towton (1860–1938), Yorkshire cricketer
 William Inge (1860–1954), Lady Margaret's Professor of Divinity, University of Cambridge, 1907–1911, and Dean of St Paul's, 1911–1934
John Frederick Peel Rawlinson (1860–1926), footballer who won the FA Cup with Old Etonians in 1882 and made one appearance for England 1881, before serving as a member of parliament for Cambridge University from 1906 to 1926.
Sir Eldon Gorst KCB, Consul-General in Egypt.
 George Lambton (1860–1945), British flat racing Champion Trainer 1906, 1911 and 1912
 Major-General Lawrence Drummond (1861–1946), First World War general
 Arthur William Cairns, 2nd Earl Cairns, (1861–1890), Private Secretary to the President of the Board of Trade
 Stanley Mordaunt Leathes (1861–1938), poet, historian and senior civil servant
 Walter Henry Montagu Douglas Scott (1861–1886), Scottish cricketer and nobleman
 A. C. Benson (1862–1925), Master of Magdalene College, Cambridge, 1915–1925, and writer
 Harry Levy-Lawson, 1st Viscount Burnham (1862–1933), Managing Proprietor, The Daily Telegraph, 1903–1928, and politician
 Field Marshal Julian Byng, 1st Viscount Byng of Vimy (1862–1935), General Officer Commanding Egypt, 1912–1914, Cavalry Corps, 1915, IX Corps, 1915–1916, XVII Corps, 1916, Canadian Corps, 1916–1917, and Third Army, 1917–1919, Governor-General of Canada, 1921–1926, and Commissioner of Police of the Metropolis, 1928–1931
 M. R. James (1862–1936), author, antiquary, Director, Fitzwilliam Museum, University of Cambridge, 1894–1908, Vice-Chancellor, University of Cambridge, 1913–1915, and Provost of Eton, 1918–1936
 William Bromley-Davenport (1862–1949), MP, soldier, England footballer 1884, and Provost of Eton, 1918–1936
Sir William Rees-Davies (1863–1939), Chief Justice of Hong Kong
 Arthur Studd (1863–1919), cricketer, artist and art collector – one of the Studd brothers
 Arthur Bourchier (1864–1927), actor-manager
 Fiennes Cornwallis, 1st Baron Cornwallis, (1864–1935), politician
 Brigadier-General George Colborne Nugent (1864–1915), Second Boer War, Killed in World War I
 Ralph Pemberton (1864–1931), cricketer
 Walter Seton (1864–1912), barrister, cricketer and soldier
 Brigadier-General Charles FitzClarence (1865–1914), Second Boer War Victoria Cross, killed in World War I
 Evelyn Metcalfe (1865–1951), cricketer
 George Murray (1865–1939), Heath Professor of Comparative Pathology, University of Durham, 1893–1908, and Professor of Systematic Medicine, Victoria University of Manchester, 1908–1925
Sidney James Agar, 4th Earl of Normanton (1865–1933)
 John Douglas-Scott-Montagu, 2nd Baron Montagu of Beaulieu (1866–1929), automobile enthusiast and expert
 Guy Nickalls (1866–1935), Olympic oarsman
 Charles Bathurst, 1st Viscount Bledisloe (1867–1958), Governor-General of New Zealand, 1930–1935, politician and agriculturist
 Algernon Burnaby (1868–1938), landowner, soldier, and Master of the Quorn Hunt
 The Hon. Henry Coventry (1868–1934), cricketer
 Sir George Herbert Duckworth (1868–1934), public servant
 Willie Llewelyn (1868–1893), cricketer
 Lord Henry Scott (1868–1945), cricketer, British Army soldier and deputy-governor of the Bank of Scotland
 George Thesiger (1868–1915), General killed in action at the battle of Loos
 Victor Christian William Cavendish, 9th Duke of Devonshire, (1868–1938), Governor General of Canada 1916–1921.
 Oliver Russell, 2nd Baron Ampthill (1869–1935), diplomat
 Godfrey Foljambe (1869–1942), cricketer

1870s
 Brigadier-General Charles Strathavon Heathcote-Drummond-Willoughby (1870–1949), soldier
 Montague MacLean (1870–1951), cricketer
 John Dawson (1871–1948), cricketer
 Major-General Sir John Gough (1871–1915), Somaliland Campaign Victoria Cross
 Montagu Norman, 1st Baron Norman (1871–1950), Governor, Bank of England, 1920–1944
 Sir Home Gordon (1871–1956), 12th Baronet Gordon of Embo, Sutherland, cricket writer and journalist
 Harold Basil Christian (1871–1950), South African/Rhodesian farmer, botanist, horticulturist focusing on aloe and cycad
 Arthur Hoare (1871–1941), cricketer and clergyman
 Richard Jones (1871–1940), cricketer
 Alexander Murray, 8th Earl of Dunmore (1872–1962), Malakand Campaign Victoria Cross
 Algernon Temple-Gore-Langton, 5th Earl Temple of Stowe (1871–1940)
 Douglas Hogg, 1st Viscount Hailsham (1872–1950), Attorney General, 1922–1924, 1924–1928, Lord Chancellor, 1928–1929, 1935–1938, and Secretary of State for War, 1931–1935
 Brigadier General Alexander Hore-Ruthven, 1st Earl of Gowrie (1872–1955), Governor of South Australia, 1928–1934, and New South Wales, 1935–1936, Governor-General of Australia, 1936–1944, and Sudan Campaign Victoria Cross
 Frederick Roberts (1872–1899), Boer War Victoria Cross
 Sir Charles Ross, 9th Baronet (1872–1942), inventor of the Ross Rifle
 Maurice Baring (1874–1945), poet, writer and journalist
 Major-General Alexander Cambridge, 1st Earl of Athlone (1874–1957), Governor-General of South Africa, 1923–1931, and Canada, 1940–1946
Sir George Russell Clerk (1874–1951), British Ambassador to France, 1934–1937
 Geoffrey Dawson (1874–1944), Editor, The Times, 1912–1919, 1923–1941
 Richard Hely-Hutchinson, 6th Earl of Donoughmore (1875–1948), Chairman of Committees, House of Lords, 1911–1931
 Robert Strutt, 4th Baron Rayleigh (1875–1947), Professor of Physics, Imperial College, London, 1908–1919
 Arthur Stanley, 5th Baron Stanley of Alderley (1875–1931), MP for Eddisbury, 1906–1910, Governor of Victoria, 1914–1920, and Chairman of the Royal Colonial Institute, 1925–1928
 Sir Trevor Bigham (1876–1954), Assistant Commissioner of Police of the Metropolis, 1914–1931, and Deputy Commissioner of Police of the Metropolis, 1931–1935
 Charles Burnell (1876–1969), oarsman
 Brigadier-General John Campbell (1876–1944), First World War Victoria Cross
 Bernard Darwin (1876–1961), golfer and sportswriter
 Edward Dent (1876–1957), Professor of Music, University of Cambridge, 1926–1941, and musicologist
 Arnold Ward (1876–1950) journalist, solicitor, MP
 Arthur Hollins (1876–1938), cricketer and chairman of Preston North End F.C.
 HRH Prince Aga Khan III (1877–1957), 48th Imam of the Shia Ismaili Muslims
Bernard Bosanquet (1877–1936), cricketer
 Sir Desmond MacCarthy (1877–1952), literary critic and writer
 Roger Quilter (1877–1953), composer
 Charles Rolls (1877–1910), managing director, Rolls-Royce, 1906–1910, engineer, aviator, cyclist, racing driver, land speed record holder and first British air accident fatality
Hubert Carr-Gomm (1877–1939), Liberal MP for Rotherhithe, 1906–18 and assistant secretary to Henry Campbell-Bannerman
 George Villiers, 6th Earl of Clarendon (1877–1955), Chairman, BBC, 1927–1930, Governor-General of South Africa, 1931–1937, and Lord Chamberlain, 1938–1952
 Edward Plunkett, 18th Baron Dunsany (1878–1957), writer
 Henry McLaren, 2nd Baron Aberconway (1879–1953), industrialist, horticulturalist and politician
 Waldorf Astor, 2nd Viscount Astor (1879–1952), Proprietor, The Observer, 1911–1945, Lord Mayor of Plymouth, 1939–1944, and politician
 Douglas Clifton Brown, 1st Viscount Ruffside (1879–1958), Speaker of the House of Commons, 1943–1951
 Sir Gerald Kelly (1879–1972), portrait painter and President of the Royal Academy, 1949–1954
 George Lloyd, 1st Baron Lloyd (1879–1941), Governor of Bombay, 1918–1923, High Commissioner for Egypt and the Sudan, 1925–1929, and Colonial Secretary, 1940–1941

1880s
 George Boyd-Rochfort (1880–1940), First World War Victoria Cross
 Henry James Bruce (1880–1951), diplomat and author
 Francis Grenfell (1880–1915), First World War Victoria Cross
 Lawrence Oates (1880–1912), Antarctic explorer
 Walter Guinness, 1st Baron Moyne (1880–1944)
 Oliver Locker-Lampson (1880–1954) MP
 Edward Ede (1881–1936), cricketer
 Lewis Evans (VC) (1881–1962)
 Frederick Septimus Kelly (1881-1916), composer
 Lewis John Mason Grant (1881- 1975), painter
 Sir Albert Napier (1881–1973), Permanent Secretary to the Lord Chancellor's Office
 William Payne-Gallwey (1881-1914), cricketer
 Eustachy, Prince Sapieha (1881–1963), Polish Foreign Secretary
 Robert Vansittart, 1st Baron Vansittart (1881–1957)
 Henry Maitland Wilson, 1st Baron Wilson (1881–1964)
 Edward Wood, 1st Earl of Halifax (1881–1959)
 Ludovic Heathcoat-Amory (1881–1918), cricketer and soldier
 John Christie (1882–1962)
 Harry Primrose, 6th Earl of Rosebery (1882–1974)
 Christopher Stone (1882–1965)
 Prince Arthur of Connaught (1883–1938)
 Arthur Borton (1883–1933)
 John Maynard Keynes, 1st baron keynes (1883–1946)
 George Lyttelton (1883–1962)
 Gerald Hugh Tyrwhitt-Wilson, 14th Baron Berners (1883–1950)
 Alexander Cadogan (1884–1968)
 Alfred Dillwyn Knox (1884–1943)
 John Murray (1884–1967)
 George Butterworth (1885–1916)
 Shane Leslie (1885–1971)
 Sir Horace James Seymour (1885–1978)
 John Jacob Astor, 1st Baron Astor of Hever (1886–1971) 
 Geoffrey Drummond (1886–1941)
 Henry Dunell (1886–1950)
 Myles Kenyon (1886–1960)
 Sir Albert Charles Gladstone, 5th Baronet, of Fasque (1886–1967)
 Hugh Dalton (1887–1962)
 Denys Finch Hatton (1887–1931)
 Julian Huxley (1887–1975)
 Henry Moseley (1887–1915)
 Julian Grenfell (1888–1915)
 Sir Charles Andrew Gladstone, 6th Baronet, of Fasque (1888–1968)
 Ronald Knox (1888–1957)
 Thomas Ralph Merton (1888–1969)
 Patrick Shaw-Stewart (1888–1917)
 Neville Elliott-Cooper (1889–1918)
 Eugen Millington-Drake (1889–1972)
 Walter Styles (1889–1965)
 Alfred Duff Cooper, 1st Viscount Norwich (1890–1954)
 Percy Hansen (1890–1951)
 Archibald Sinclair, 1st Viscount Thurso (1890–1970)

1890s
 Edmond Foljambe (1890–1960), first-class cricketer
 Stewart Menzies (1890–1968), head of MI6 during World War II
 Archer Windsor-Clive (1890–1914), the first first-class cricketer to be killed during World War I 
 Anthony Muirhead (1890-1939), Member of Parliament (MP) for Wells in Somerset 1929-1939
 Arthur Batten-Pooll (1891–1971), First World War soldier who was awarded the Victoria Cross
 William Congreve (1891–1916), First World War soldier, Victoria Cross
 Walter D'Arcy Hall (1891–1980), Soldier, Member of Parliament
 Edward Stephenson (1891–1969), cricketer and soldier
 William Boswell (1892–1916), cricketer
 Edward Bridges, 1st Baron Bridges (1892–1969), Cabinet Secretary, 1938–1945, and Permanent Secretary to the Treasury, 1945–1956
 Wykeham Stanley Cornwallis, 2nd Baron Cornwallis (1892–1982)
 Sir Reginald Graham (1892–1980), First World War Victoria Cross
 J. B. S. Haldane (1892–1964), Professor of Genetics and of Biometry, University College, London, 1933–1957
 Ewart Horsfall (1892–1974), oarsman who competed in the 1912 and 1920 Summer Olympics
 Sir Osbert Sitwell (1892–1969), writer
 George Llewelyn Davies (1893 - 1915), along with his four younger brothers the inspiration for playwright J. M. Barrie's characters of Peter Pan and the Lost Boys, killed in action in the Second Battle of Ypres, Belgium, 15 March 1915
 General Sir Frank Messervy (1893-1974) British Indian Army officer in the First and Second World Wars. First Commander-in-Chief of the Pakistan Army following independence
 HM King Prajadhipok of Siam (1893–1941), King of Siam, 1925–1935
 Oliver Lyttelton, 1st Viscount Chandos (1893–1972), Colonial Secretary, 1951–1954
 William Forbes-Sempill, 19th Lord Sempill (1893-1965), naval aviator and traitor
 Brigadier Sir Richard Gambier-Parry, KCMG (1894–1965), head of Section VIII of the Secret Intelligence Service, Director of Communications Hanslope Park, Operation Tracer
 Aldous Huxley (1894–1963), novelist
 General Sir Oliver Leese (1894–1978), General Officer Commanding XXX Corps, 1942–1943, GOC Eighth Army, 1943–1944, Commander-in-Chief, Allied Land Forces, South-East Asia, 1944–1945, and General Officer Commanding-in-Chief Eastern Command, 1945–1946
 Harold Macmillan, 1st Earl of Stockton (1894–1986), Chancellor of the Exchequer, 1955–1957, and Prime Minister, 1957–1963
 Peter Warlock (1894–1930), composer and writer on music
 Thomas Corbett, 2nd Baron Rowallan (1895–1977), Chief Scout of the Commonwealth, 1945–1959, and Governor of Tasmania, 1959–1963
 Terence Gray (Wei Wu Wei) (1895–1987), theatrical producer, author
 Geoffrey Madan (1895–1947), anthologist
 Colonel George Edward Younghusband CBE, (1896–1970), Soldier serving in WWI and WWII, POW Italy, Vincigliata,
 Sir Frederick Boy Browning (1896–1965), General Officer Commanding I Airborne Corps, 1943–1944
 John Dunville (1896–1917), First World War Victoria Cross
 Tim Massy-Beresford (1896–1987), British Army officer 
 Sir Henry Segrave (1896–1930), engineer, racing driver, aviator and holder of land speed record
 Anthony Eden, 1st Earl of Avon (1897–1977), Secretary of State for Foreign Affairs, 1935–1938, 1940–1945, 1951–1955, and Prime Minister, 1955–1957
 Arthur Rhys Davids (1897–1917). Royal Flying Corps Distinguished Service Order, Military Cross First World War.
 Julian Royds Gribble (1897–1918), First World War Victoria Cross
 Peter Llewelyn Davies (1897–1960), awarded the Military Cross for service during World War I; in 1926 founded the publishing house Peter Davies Ltd.
 Lieut. Richard Byrd Levett (1897–1917), King's Royal Rifle Corps, killed in action, Irles, France, 14 March 1917
 Lieutenant-General Herbert Lumsden (1897–1945)
 Francis Manners, 4th Baron Manners (1897–1972)
 Sir Sacheverell Sitwell (1897–1988)
 General Sir Richard McCreery (1898–1967), General Officer Commanding Eighth Army, Northern Italy, 1944–1945
 Colin Hercules Mackenzie (1898–1986), founder of Force 136
 Leo d'Erlanger (1898– 1978), banker 
 John Cobb (1899–1952), racing driver and holder of land speed record
 Christopher Hussey (1899–1970), architectural historian and writer
  Henry Gray Studholme Bt. (1899–1987) Conservative MP
 Thomas Brand, 4th Viscount Hampden (1900–1965)
 HRH Prince Henry, Duke of Gloucester (1900–1974)
 John Fremantle, 4th Baron Cottesloe (1900–1994)
 Michael Llewelyn Davies (1900 - 1921), along with his four brothers the inspiration for playwright J. M. Barrie's characters of Peter Pan and the Lost Boys, drowned at Sandford Lock near Oxford, England on 19 May 1921
 Michael Mason (1900–1982)
 Thomas Brocklebank Baronet and cricketer (1899-1953)
 George Scott-Chad (1899–1950), cricketer

See also 

 List of Old Etonians born before the 18th century
 List of Old Etonians born in the 18th century
 List of Old Etonians born in the 20th century

References

 
Lists of people associated with Eton College
Lists of 19th-century people
19th century in England